Maan Abu Taleb (born 1981) is a Jordanian-British novelist and cultural editor. He was born and raised in Amman, and studied philosophy and critical theory at the Centre for Research in Modern European Philosophy, Kingston University. In 2012, Abu Taleb launched Ma3azef, now the leading online music magazine in Arabic. He is also an accomplished fiction writer; his debut novel Kol El Maarek (2016) received critical acclaim. The English translation of the book (titled All the Battles) was longlisted for the Banipal Prize. 

Abu Taleb lives in the UK.

References

Jordanian novelists
1981 births
Living people
Alumni of Kingston University
People from Amman